Sir Leo Finn Bernard Cussen (29 November 1859 – 17 May 1933), Australian jurist, was a Judge of the Supreme Court of Victoria. Cussen died at his home in Melbourne on 17 May, 1933.

Early life and education
Cussen was born in Portland on the western coast of Victoria in 1859. He was educated at Hamilton College in Hamilton. He studied civil engineering at the University of Melbourne, graduating with a Certificate of Civil Engineering in 1879. He was a talented sportsman, and represented the University in both cricket and Australian rules football. After graduating, he took a job with the Government of Victoria's Department of Railways, where he worked on the railway between Melbourne and Ballarat.

Cussen returned to the University of Melbourne to study arts and law, graduating with a Bachelor of Arts in 1884, and a Master of Arts and Bachelor of Laws degrees in 1886.

Career
Cussen was admitted to the Victorian Bar to practice as a barrister in September of that year. He continued to play cricket, and was a member of the Victorian Bar XI. In 1890, he was appointed as a lecturer in law at the University of Melbourne. Also in that year, he married Johanna Bevan, with whom he would have six sons and a daughter.

On 19 March 1906, Cussen was appointed a Judge of the Supreme Court of Victoria. He was widely regarded as an excellent judge. Sir Owen Dixon, himself regarded as Australia's foremost judge, once described Cussen as "the greatest of all judges."  In 1921 he was knighted for his services as a Judge in the Supreme Court of Victoria.

Cussen conducted two consolidations of all the Acts of the Parliament of Victoria, the first in 1915 and the second in 1928. Consolidation involves compiling all amendments of a particular act into one document. In 1922, Cussen drafted the bill for the Imperial Acts Application Act 1922, which set out which laws of the Parliament of the United Kingdom were in force in Victoria. The Act, along with the 1928 version of the consolidated acts, set out every piece of legislation in force in the state at the time in a central location. Cussen was knighted in 1922 in recognition of this effort, in addition to his work as a judge. He continued to sit on the bench, in 1924, and again later in 1931-1932, serving as Acting Chief Justice of Victoria.

Aside from his legal work, Cussen was involved in the public life of Victoria. Cussen was elected the President of the Melbourne Cricket Club in 1907, a position he would hold until his death. Cussen remains the longest-serving President of the club. In 1916, Cussen had been made a trustee of the State Library of Victoria, the Victorian Museum and the National Gallery of Victoria, then run by a single board of trustees, and in 1928 he was made President of the board.

Legacy
The Leo Cussen Institute, which provides legal education, was established in 1972 by the Parliament of Victoria and named in Cussen's honour. The Graduates' Association of the Institute conduct the Leo Cussen Memorial Lecture, first held in 1986, and held in most years since.

Notes

References
 

1859 births
1933 deaths
Judges of the Supreme Court of Victoria
People from Portland, Victoria
Australian Knights Bachelor
University of Melbourne alumni
Australian rules footballers from Victoria (Australia)